USS Haddock has been the name of three United States Navy ships:

USS Haddock, renamed  while under construction, a submarine in commission from 1914 to 1923
, a submarine in commission from 1942 to 1947
, a submarine in commission from 1967 to 1993

United States Navy ship names